Hai-Lung Dai is a  Taiwanese-born American physical chemist and university administrator. He currently is the Laura H. Carnell Professor of Chemistry and Vice President for International Affairs at Temple University in Philadelphia, Pennsylvania, in the United States.

Biography 

Dai was born in Taiwan. He completed a BSc in chemistry at National Taiwan University in 1974, following military service, and went to the United States in 1976 for graduate studies. He obtained his doctorate in chemistry from the University of California at Berkeley in 1981, and then did postdoctoral research at the Massachusetts Institute of Technology until 1984. That year he began teaching in the Chemistry Department of the University of Pennsylvania in Philadelphia, where he remained for twenty-two years and became department chair and the Hirschmann-Makineni Professor. He founded the Penn Science Teacher Institute that eventually trained 300 in-service science teachers and was named as a model for training science teachers in a 2005 National Academy of Sciences white paper. In 2007 he became Dean of the College of Science and Technology of Temple University, also in Philadelphia, Pennsylvania, and was Provost of Temple University during 2012 - 2016. During his time as provost, Temple's USNWR ranking went from #135 to #115 and Temple became a Carnegie R1 Highest Research Activity University. In 2017, Dai was appointed  vice president for International Affairs at Temple University.

Publications 

Dai is editor of books including:

 Hai-Lung Dai, Robert W. Field (editors) (1995). Molecular dynamics and spectroscopy by stimulated emission pumping. Singapore; New Jersey; London; Hong Kong: World Scientific. .
 Hai-Lung Dai, Wilson Ho (editors) (1995). Laser spectroscopy and photochemistry on metal surfaces. Singapore; New Jersey; London; Hong Kong: World Scientific. .

Recognition 

Dai has received several honors and awards, among them:

 1985: Camille and Henry Dreyfus Foundation New Faculty Award
 1988: Sloan Fellowship
 1989: The Camille and Henry Dreyfus Foundation Teacher-Scholar Award
 1990: Coblentz Award in Spectroscopy
 1992: Fellowship of the American Physical Society
 1994: Alexander von Humboldt Award for Senior US Scientists
 1995: Philadelphia Section Award, American Chemical Society
 2000: Guggenheim Fellowship
 2006: Ellis Lippincott Award for Spectroscopy of the Optical Society of America
 2009: Distinguished Achievement Award, the Institute of Chinese Engineers in the U.S.
 2010: Fellowship of the American Chemical Society
 2012: Langmuir Lecturer Award, Division of Colloid and Surface Chemistry, American Chemical Society
 2013: Michael P. Malone International Leadership Award, Association of Public and Land Grant Universities
 2017: Knight Order of the Italian Star, Government of Italy
 2017: Distinguished Alumni Award, National Taiwan University
 2019: Hai-Lung Dai Festschrift, Journal of Physical Chemistry, American Chemical Society

References

Taiwanese emigrants to the United States
Temple University faculty
National Taiwan University alumni
University of California, Berkeley alumni
University of Pennsylvania faculty
Living people
Year of birth missing (living people)
Taiwanese chemists
Physical chemists
Fellows of the American Chemical Society
Sloan Fellows
Humboldt Research Award recipients
Fellows of the American Physical Society